Bi Zhu Qing (born 6 September 1988) is a professional pool and snooker player from China. She is best known as the winner of the WPA World Nine-ball Championship in 2011.

Biography
Bi started playing snooker in 2005, taking up pool three years later, and was a member of Chinese government supported training programmes designed to manufacture winners.

At her first world championship in 2010, Bi was ranked 81st in the world and had no notable pool tournament wins, so her victory, including a 9–7 defeat of Chen Siming in the final, was a surprising result.

Tournament results
2007 Asian Indoor Games – Women's Snooker Champion
2007 IBSF World Under-21 Snooker Champion
2009 Asian Indoor Games Six-red snooker singles – silver medal
2009 East Asian Games six-red snooker singles – silver medal
2010 Asian Games – Women's six-red snooker singles – bronze medal
2010 Asian Games – Women's six-red snooker team – silver medal
2011 WPA Women's World Nine-ball Champion – beat Chen Siming 9–7 in the final.

References

External links

Living people
female pool players
Chinese pool players 
1988 births
Asian Games medalists in cue sports
Cue sports players at the 2010 Asian Games
Asian Games silver medalists for China
Asian Games bronze medalists for China
Medalists at the 2010 Asian Games